Yoshikiyo is a masculine Japanese given name.

Possible writings
Yoshikiyo can be written using many different combinations of kanji characters. Here are some examples: 

義清, "justice, pure"
義潔, "justice, pure"
佳清, "skilled, pure"
佳潔, "skilled, pure"
善清, "virtuous, pure"
善潔, "virtuous, pure"
吉清, "good luck, pure"
吉潔, "good luck, pure"
良清, "good, pure"
良潔, "good, pure"
恭清, "respectful, pure"
嘉清, "excellent, pure"
嘉潔, "excellent, pure"
能清, "capacity, pure"
喜清, "rejoice, pure"
芳清, "fragrant/virtuous, pure"
義紀代, "justice, chronicle, generation"

The name can also be written in hiragana よしきよ or katakana ヨシキヨ.

Notable people with the name
, Japanese anatomist and anthropologist 
, Japanese footballer
, Japanese samurai
, Japanese daimyō
, Japanese samurai

Japanese masculine given names